Richard Drummie (born 20 March 1959) is an English guitarist, songwriter and producer. Drummie and Peter Cox are the founding members of musical group Go West.

Early career and Go West

Drummie was born in London. He began writing with longtime collaborator Peter Cox, with whom he eventually signed a publishing deal. In 1982, the two formed the band Go West, with Cox as lead singer and Drummie on guitar and backing vocals. For the next few years, Go West tried to land a recording contract until, with the help of manager John Glover and producer Gary Stevenson, they finally recorded their first two singles: "We Close Our Eyes" and "Call Me".

After Go West signed a deal with Chrysalis Records, "We Close Our Eyes" became a top 5 hit in the UK Singles Chart in 1985. Other Go West singles released that year included "Call Me" (1985) and "Don't Look Down". The following year, Go West was named 'Best Newcomer' at the 1986 BRIT Awards.

In 1990, Go West finally achieved success in the United States with their single "King of Wishful Thinking", which reached No. 8 on the U.S. chart and was featured on the soundtrack of the film Pretty Woman. "Faithful", released in 1992, reached No. 14 in the States.

Personal life
Drummie, who grew up in Skelmersdale and Ormskirk with his grandparents, has two children: a son and a daughter. In 1993, he and Cox moved to Los Angeles, but Drummie returned to the United Kingdom in 1996.

References

1959 births
Living people
English pop guitarists
English male guitarists
English songwriters
English record producers
Go West (band) members
Musicians from London
British male songwriters